Varmah Sonie (born July 8, 1990) is an American football cornerback who is currently a free agent. He played college football at Northern Iowa.

Early life
Sonie attended Apple Valley High School in Apple Valley, Minnesota, where he played football, basketball and track and field. As a senior member of the football team in 2008, Sonie played defensive back, wide receiver and was the Return specialist for the Eagles, catching in 41 passes, received 36 carries and had 6 interceptions, totaling in 10 touchdowns. His season earned him Minnesota's Mr. Football Award, as well as being named a Max Prep All-American.

College career
Sonie continued his football career at the University of Northern Iowa. As a junior in 2011, Sonie was named First-team All-Missouri Valley Football Conference.

Professional career

Portland Thunder
In November 2013, Sonie was assigned to the Portland Thunder of the Arena Football League (AFL). In 2014, his play earned him First-team All-Arena honors.

Tampa Bay Buccaneers
On December 16, 2014, Sonie signed to the practice squad of the Tampa Bay Buccaneers of the National Football League (NFL).

Cleveland Browns
On February 16, 2015, Sonie signed a three-year contract with the Cleveland Browns of the National Football League (NFL). He was waived on May 11, 2015.

Orlando Predators
On January 4, 2016, Sonie was assigned to the Orlando Predators.

Baltimore Brigade
On February 1, 2017, Sonie was assigned to Baltimore Brigade. He earned Second-team All-Arena honors in 2017.

Albany Empire
On March 19, 2018, Sonie was assigned to the Albany Empire.

Columbus Destroyers
On March 5, 2019, Sonie was assigned to the Columbus Destroyers.

Albany Empire
On July 19, 2021, Sonie was signed again by the Albany Empire (NAL)

References

External links
Northern Iowa bio

1990 births
Living people
American football defensive backs
African-American players of American football
Cleveland Browns players
Northern Iowa Panthers football players
Portland Thunder players
People from Burnsville, Minnesota
Players of American football from Minnesota
Tampa Bay Buccaneers players
Baltimore Brigade players
Albany Empire (AFL) players
Columbus Destroyers players
Apple Valley High School (Minnesota) alumni
21st-century African-American sportspeople